Racoș is a commune in Brașov County, Romania.

Racoș may also refer to:
 Racoș River (Râul Negru), Romania
 Racoș River (Someș), Romania

See also 
 Raco (disambiguation)